
Gmina Ksawerów is a rural gmina (administrative district) in Pabianice County, Łódź Voivodeship, in central Poland.

Villages
Gmina Ksawerów contains the villages and settlements of Kolonia Wola Zaradzyńska, Ksawerów, Nowa Gadka and Wola Zaradzyńska.

Neighbouring gminas
Gmina Ksawerów is bordered by the towns of Łódź and Pabianice, and by the gmina of Rzgów.

References
Polish official population figures 2006

Ksawerow
Pabianice County